Michael Harrison was a soldier, and a BBC radio presenter, active in the 1940s.

He appeared as a castaway on the BBC Radio programme Desert Island Discs on 25 August 1945.

References 

BBC radio presenters
Year of birth missing
Year of death missing
Place of death missing
Place of birth missing